Bent Gunnar Bøgsted (born 4 January 1956 in Serritslev) is a Danish politician, who is a member of the Folketing for the Danish People's Party. He was elected into parliament at the 2001 Danish general election.

Background
Bøgsted graduated from Aalborg Technical School. Before being elected into parliament, Bøgsted has worked as an operator, gunsmith, farmer and shipyard worker.

Political career
Bøgsted first ran for parliament in the 2001 Danish general election, where he was elected into parliament with 4,608 votes cast for him. He was reelected in the 2005, 2007, 2011, 2015 and 2019 elections.

External links 
 Biography on the website of the Danish Parliament (Folketinget)

References 

Living people
1956 births
People from Brønderslev Municipality
Danish People's Party politicians
Gunsmiths
20th-century Danish farmers
Members of the Folketing 2001–2005
Members of the Folketing 2005–2007
Members of the Folketing 2007–2011
Members of the Folketing 2011–2015
Members of the Folketing 2015–2019
Members of the Folketing 2019–2022
21st-century Danish farmers